James Henry "Biddy" Anderson (26 April 1874 – 11 March 1926) was a South African cricketer and rugby union player.

Anderson attended Diocesan College in Rondebosch before going to Oxford University, where he was awarded a rugby Blue. A right-handed batsman, he played in one Test cricket match in 1902, when he captained South Africa against Australia in Johannesburg. He captained Western Province in the Currie Cup in 1903-04, scoring 109 in the semi-final win over Border, who totalled only 107 in their two innings.

He also played three rugby union Tests for South Africa in 1896. He also played for clubs in Italy and France. He is one of six men to have played both cricket and rugby Tests for South Africa.

Anderson was a farmer and racehorse breeder near Bredasdorp in Cape Province.

References

External links

1874 births
1926 deaths
Alumni of Diocesan College, Cape Town
Alumni of the University of Oxford
Cricketers from Kimberley, Northern Cape
Rugby union players from Kimberley, Northern Cape
South Africa international rugby union players
South Africa Test cricket captains
South African people of British descent
South African rugby union players
Western Province cricketers